Ophrys × arachnitiformis, the false spider orchid, is an orchid native to Europe. It is apparently a hybrid resulting from a cross between O. fuciflora × O. sphegodes, but has become established in the wild in Britain, France (including Corsica), Germany, parts of Italy (Liguria, Tuscany, Lazio, Apulia, Sicily, Sardinia), Austria, Switzerland, Hungary, and the former Yugoslavia.

References

External links

arachnitiformis
Orchids of Europe
Orchids of France
Flora of Corsica
Flora of Sicily
Flora of Sardinia
Flora of Austria
Flora of Switzerland
Flora of Hungary
Flora of Croatia
Flora of Slovenia
Plants described in 1860
Interspecific orchid hybrids